Cooks Brook Beach is a Town of Eastham beach on the bay side of Cape Cod, in North Eastham, Massachusetts.  It is located at the end of Steele Road, which is off Massasoit Road.

External links

Capeguide

Beaches of Massachusetts
Eastham, Massachusetts
Landforms of Barnstable County, Massachusetts
Tourist attractions in Barnstable County, Massachusetts